Tappeh-ye Mir Ahmad (also Romanized as Tappeh-ye Mīr Aḩmad) is a village in Sarakhs Rural District, in the Central District of Sarakhs County, Razavi Khorasan Province, Iran. At the 2006 census, its population was 2,639, in 574 families.

References 

Populated places in Sarakhs County